Munachi Abii (born Munachi Gail Teresa Abii Nwankwo)  is a Nigerian rapper/hip-hop artist, songwriter, television presenter model, and actress who performs under the name Muna. She is the winner of Most Beautiful Girl in Nigeria (MBGN) 2007. She is an  Igbo lady who hails from Imo state.

Early life
Born and raised in Port Harcourt and Owerri Nigeria. Muna was encouraged by her family and friends to pursue her passion for music and arts. After obtaining her O'Level qualifications from Federal Government Girls' College, Abuloma, she studied International Relations and Diplomacy at Benson Idahosa University.

Career

Pageants

While she was 20 years old, during her second year at University in 2007, Muna won the Most Beautiful Girl in Nigeria pageant. Her platform as reigning queen was Polio and Sickle cell Awareness, and she represented Nigeria at Miss World in China later that year. In 2009, Muna worked with MBGN 2000 winner Matilda Kerry on a project to raise awareness for cervical cancer.

Music
Prior to winning MBGN, Muna had performed as part of Port Harcourt-based rap group The Specimen A and collaborated with Terry da Rapman on the critically acclaimed My PH Girl. Contrary to popular belief, Muna did not start her music career with rap group Ijaw Boyz, although she did perform with them as a guest artist. As a solo rapper, she performed as Babyrella before changing her stage name to Muna, and as a songwriter, she has written songs for artistes such as J Martins and Waje. She also appeared in several music videos, most notably in P Square's "Ifunanya".

In June 2010, after years of collaborating with various artistes, Muna signed a multi-year management contract with Ayo Shonaiya's RMG company and started working on her debut album The Goddess, The Hustler, which will include the singles I Feel Real, and Killer Queen. Muna continues to collaborate with other hip hop artistes; in early 2011, she wrote the lyrics and featured on Waje's hit single So Inspired and also appeared in rapper Suspect's video for I No Send You.

Muna was one of the female rappers to feature and represent Nigeria on the globally televised BET Cypher for the BET Awards in 2011, and in April 2012, Muna released two singles Here To Stay and Down Down Low.

Acting
In 2019, Muna featured in the Nollywood movie Living in Bondage: Breaking Free.

In 2020, Abii co-starred in the romantic drama film, Finding Hubby and in 2022 she featured in Obsession

Other work
In 2011, Muna signed an endorsement deal with Unilever as a model for Lux and featured in a commercial for the brand, following in the footsteps of Patti Boulaye and Genevieve Nnaji.

In April 2011, after shooting the video for her feature on Michael Word's Pop Sugar, she co-presented the television series Malta Guinness Street Dance Africa. Muna also presented the Mr Nigeria Pageant and in 2012, The Nokia Don't Break The Beat multi-city Rap Battle contest.

Awards and nominations

References

External links

1987 births
Miss World 2007 delegates
Living people
Igbo beauty pageant contestants
Igbo rappers
Rappers from Port Harcourt
Women hip hop musicians
Most Beautiful Girl in Nigeria winners
Nigerian female models
Nigerian women rappers
21st-century Nigerian musicians
Nigerian hip hop singers
Television personalities from Rivers State
Songwriters from Rivers State
Port Harcourt hip hop
Beauty pageant contestants from Rivers State
Benson Idahosa University alumni
21st-century women musicians
Most Beautiful Girl in Nigeria contestants
Nigerian beauty pageant contestants
Nigerian television personalities
Igbo actresses
Nigerian television presenters
Actresses from Imo State
Nigerian film actresses